Misgund is a town in Kou-Kamma Local Municipality in the Eastern Cape province of South Africa. The name is Afrikaans and means "begrudged".

References

Populated places in the Kou-Kamma Local Municipality